Colin Gregor (born 31 May 1981) is a retired Scottish rugby union player. He was the captain of the Scotland 7s team from 2009 to 2014. He is only the eighth player, and first Scot, to score over 1,000 points on the IRB Sevens World Series. He is one of only 13 in all forms of rugby. 
Gregor retired as the most capped sevens player in Scottish history, playing in 58 IRB Sevens World Series tournaments, three Sevens World Cups (in Hong Kong 2005, Dubai 2009 and Moscow 2013) and two Commonwealth Games in Melbourne, 2006. And as captain at Glasgow 2014. He played as a Scrum-half or Fly-half.

Professional career

Prior to signing a full-time contract to captain the 7s team in 2011, Gregor signed professional terms with Glasgow Warriors in 2004. Colin amassed over 100 appearances in 8 years at the Glasgow Warriors. During this time he also featured 9 times for Scotland A, including selection for the Churchill Cup in 2006 and 2008, alongside regular appearances on the IRB Sevens World Series. He was called up to the senior Scotland training squad in October 2008, however he was ultimately not capped at that level.

Amateur career
His rugby career started with mini rugby at GHK and subsequently Glasgow Hawks. In the latter years of his education at Balfron High School he joined his local team, Strathendrick RFC. Colin played an integral role as the team in the 8th division of Scottish rugby went on a 'fairytale run' to the semi-finals of the Scottish Cup.

After moving to Edinburgh, in 1999, to study history at the University of Edinburgh (graduated with a 2:1 MA History) he joined Watsonians. In his final year of study he first represented Scotland, at the 2003 Hong Kong 7s. Whilst playing for Watsonians RFC he regularly competed on the King of the Sevens circuit, winning tournaments at Gala, Hawick, Jed-Forest, Peebles and Earlston.

Coaching career

On 30 March 2016 it was announced that Gregor would be the new Assistant Coach of Glasgow Hawks, his former side.

Other activities
Gregor also writes regular articles for The Sun newspaper and undertakes charity work for The Craig Hodgkinson Trust and Chest Heart Stroke Scotland. Furthermore, he is a "Champion" for the Winning Scotland Foundation "Champions in Schools" project.

References

External links
 
 Colin Gregor at Scottish Rugby

1981 births
Living people
Commonwealth Games rugby sevens players of Scotland
Glasgow Warriors players
Male rugby sevens players
Place of birth missing (living people)
Rugby sevens players at the 2006 Commonwealth Games
Scotland 'A' international rugby union players
Scotland international rugby sevens players
Scottish rugby union coaches
Scottish rugby union players